Krosspynten is a headland at the western side of Wijdefjorden in Andrée Land at Spitsbergen, Svalbard. The branch Vestfjorden mouths into Wijdefjorden at Krosspynten.

Krosspynten is included in the Indre Wijdefjorden National Park. A trapper's cabin which was built at Krosspynten in 1910 has been relocated to a museum in Tromsø.

References

Headlands of Spitsbergen